LEHS may refer to these secondary schools:

England
 Lady Eleanor Holles School, a South West London private school

United States
 Lugoff-Elgin High School, Lugoff, South Carolina
 Lakota East High School, Liberty Township, Ohio
 English High School (Lynn, Massachusetts)

See also
 Leh (disambiguation)
 Leh's, a closed store in Allentown, Pennsylvania, United States
 LES (disambiguation)
 Less (disambiguation)
 Lez (disambiguation)
 Lay (disambiguation)